Svenska nyheter (Swedish for Swedish News) is a Swedish weekly satirical comedy programme broadcast on SVT1, making fun of that week's latest news stories. The show was hosted by comedian Jesper Rönndahl during season 1 to 3 (2018 – 2019; there are two seasons per year). Kristoffer Appelquist was the host season 4 to 10 (2019 – 2022). Messiah Hallberg is the new host beginning with season 11 (2023).

In September 2018, the show received international attention when it made fun of China and Chinese customs.

In October 2022, the show again received international attention when it made fun of Turkish president Recep Erdoğan. The turkish foreign ministry summoned Swedens ambassador to Turkey, to provide a complaint about the shows joked about the president. Sweden had just before applied for NATO membership as protection against a possible invasion by Russia, membership applications must be approved by all members, something Turkey has hesitated on.

Episodes

Season 1 (2018)

Season 2 (2018)

Season 3 (2019)

References

External links 
 Svenska nyheter on SVT Play 
 

2010s Swedish television series
Swedish satirical television shows
News parodies
2018 Swedish television series debuts
Year of television series ending missing
Sveriges Television original programming
Swedish-language television shows